Aisha Jummai Al-Hassan (16 September 1959 – 7 May 2021), popularly known as Mama Taraba, was a Nigerian lawyer and politician. She was appointed in 2015 to the cabinet of President Muhammadu Buhari after his election until her resignation in July 2018.

She was previously a senator, representing Taraba North senatorial district of Taraba State, Nigeria which she won under the platform of the People's Democratic Party (PDP). She later decamped to the main opposition party All Progressive Congress (APC) and became the gubernatorial candidate of the party in Taraba State for the 2015 general elections. She was defeated in the election re-run held on 25 April 2015, but on 7 November 2015 tribunal removed Taraba Governor, Darius Ishaku,
declared Aisha Alhassan of the All Progressives Congress winner of 11 April 2015 poll, this was later reversed by the Appeal and Supreme Courts of Nigeria.

She resigned as the Minister of Women Affairs of Nigeria on 27 July 2018.

Early life and career 
Al-Hassan was born on 16 September 1959 and was a Fulani. A lawyer by training, she became the first female to be appointed Taraba State Attorney General and Commissioner of Justice. The first woman to be appointed Secretary FCT judicial council and later appointed the Chief Registrar of the High Court of the Federal Capital Territory, Abuja on 17 December 2003. After she retired from service she went into business.

Political career

Senate 
In the January 2011 PDP primaries, Jummai defeated the incumbent senator, former Ambassador Manzo Anthony.

In the 9 April 2011 elections, Jummai won 114,131 votes, followed by Jolly Nyame of the Action Congress of Nigeria (ACN) with 92,004 votes.
She was one of four women elected on the PDP ticket, the others being Nkechi Nwaogu (Abia Central), Helen Esuene (Akwa Ibom South) and Nenadi Usman (Kaduna South). 
Following the election, she was said to have been in competition for the Senate President seat.

Gubernatorial candidacy 
Alhassan contested the 2015 elections under the Platform of the All Progressive Congress (APC). She lost to the candidate of the People's Democratic Party (PDP) Darius Ishaku.

In November 2015, she was declared the winner of April 2015 Taraba state gubernatorial election, and became the first woman in Nigeria to become a Governor. This judgement was later reversed by the Appeal Court, who stated that APC did not have jurisdiction over the primaries of PDP.

She resigned from her federal appointment and decamped to UDP after she was screened out by the ruling party APC from contesting the Governorship Seat. She was unanimously declared as the candidate for March 2019 Taraba State gubernatorial election under UDP, after the other candidate stepped down in her bid. She later announced her defection back to PDP after the governorship election, which was won again by Darius Ishaku of Peoples Democratic Party, as the Governor of Taraba State.

She is widely known as "Mama Taraba", because of her increased influence in the politics of her state.

Personal life 
Jummai's elder brother is former Senator Abdulazeez Ibrahim from 1999-2007. She actively supported the Taraba State Football Association.

Death 
She died in a Cairo hospital, Egypt at the age of 61.

President Muhammadu Buhari and former vice president Atiku mourns Mama Taraba.In their reaction to the death, President Buhari said he is saddened, while Atiku said he is grieved by the death of the former Minister of Women Affairs.

References 
  

1959 births
2021 deaths
Members of the Senate (Nigeria)
Buhari administration personnel
Peoples Democratic Party (Nigeria) politicians
People from Taraba State
Nigerian women lawyers
21st-century Nigerian women politicians
21st-century Nigerian politicians
20th-century Nigerian lawyers
21st-century Nigerian lawyers